Coleophora remizella is a moth of the family Coleophoridae. It is found in Slovakia, Hungary, Romania, Bulgaria and southern Russia.

The larvae feed on Kochia prostrata. They feed on the generative organs of their host plant.

References

remizella
Moths of Europe
Moths described in 1983